List of chairmen of the State Council of the Republic of Tatarstan.

This is a list of chairmen (speakers) of the Supreme Council of Tatarstan (from 1992: the State Council of the Republic of Tatarstan):

Sources

Lists of legislative speakers in Russia
Chairmen